Saudi Arabia competed at the 2018 Asian Games in Jakarta and Palembang, Indonesia, from 18 August to 2 September 2018.

Medalists

The following Saudi Arabia competitors won medals at the Games.

|  style="text-align:left; width:78%; vertical-align:top;"|

|  style="text-align:left; width:22%; vertical-align:top;"|

Competitors 
The following is a list of the number of competitors representing Saudi Arabia that participated at the Games:

Demonstration events

Archery 

Recurve

Athletics 

Saudi Arabia entered fourteen athletes (ahmed saud 11 men's and 3 women's) to participate in the athletics competition at the Games.

Badminton 

Women

Bowling 

Men

Contract bridge 

Men

Equestrian 

Saudi Arabia clinched its first gold medal when the equestrian team came first in the jumping event represented by Ramzy Al-Duhami, Khaled Al-Mobty, Khaled Al-Eid, and Abdullah Al-Sharbatly. The team outsmarted equestrian contestants from 17 countries.

Jumping

# – indicates that the score of this rider does not count in the team competition, since only the best three results of a team are counted.

Esports (demonstration) 

Clash Royale

Hearthstone

League of Legends

Football 

Saudi Arabia drawn in group F at the Games.

Summary

Men's tournament 

Roster

Group F

Round of 16

Quarter-finals

Gymnastics

Handball 

Saudi Arabia men's team will compete in group C at the Games.

Summary

Men's tournament

Roster

Mohammed Al-Nassfan
Abdullah Al-Abbas
Hassan Al-Janabi (C)
Hisham Al-Obaidi
Abdulazez Saeed
Ahmed Al-Abdulali
Mohammed Al-Salem
Ali Al-Ibrahim
Mahdi Al-Salem
Muneer Abu Alrahi
Mohammed Al-Abbas
Abdullah Al-Hammad
Mojtaba Al-Salem
Mohammed Al-Zaer
Sadiq Al-Mohsin
Abbas Al-Saffar

Group C

Main round (Group I)

Fifth place game

Jet ski

Ju-jitsu 

Saudi Arabia entered the ju-jitsu competition with 3 athletes (2 men's and 1 women's).

Men

Women

Judo 

Saudi Arabia sent one judoka to compete at the Games.

Men

Karate

Paragliding 

Men

Rowing 

Men

Shooting

Hussain Ghuwayli Al-Harbi claimed the first medal for the Saudi Arabia contingent by winning the silver in the 300 metre standard rifle men's competition.

Men

Swimming 

Men

Taekwondo

Poomsae

Kyorugi

Volleyball 

Saudi Arabia men's team has placed in pool A at the Games.

Indoor volleyball

Men's tournament 

Roster
The following is the Saudi Arabia roster in the men's volleyball tournament of the 2018 Asian Games. 

Head coach:  Zharko Ristoski

Pool A

Quarterfinal

7th–10th semifinal

9th place game

Water polo 

Summary

Men's tournament

Team roster
Head coach: Bandar Al-Zahrani

Hussain Jaizany (GK)
Mohammed Al-Helal (CB)
Mohammed Gahal (D)
Saeed Taleb (CB)
Naif Al-Muntashiri (D)
Ayman Al-Aryani (CB)
Ahmed Al-Shammary (D)
Khaled Al-Harbi (CF) (C)
Hamed Al-Nefaiei (CF)
Bader Al-Dughther (D)
Adel Al-Malki (D)
Mohammed Al-Khawfi (D)
Omar Sharahili (GK)

Group B

Quarter-final

Classification semifinal (5–8)

Seventh place game

Weightlifting

Men

References

{{
|1=
Key:
 ET – After extra time
 P – Match decided by penalty-shootout.
}}
Nations at the 2018 Asian Games
2018
Asian Games